Kitinen is a river in Finland. The river flows through the municipalities of Kittilä, Pelkosenniemi, and Sodankylä in the Finnish region of Lapland. The Porttipahta Reservoir and a hydroelectric power plant are located on the upper course of the river. Tributaries of Kitinen are Kemijoki, Luiro, and Sattanen.

See also
List of rivers in Finland

References

External links
 

Kemijoki basin
Rivers of Kittilä
Rivers of Sodankylä
Rivers of Finland